Kittirat Kerdlaphee (born 11 October 1999) is a Thai tennis player.

Kerdlaphee has a career high ATP singles ranking of 1350 achieved on 13 November 2017. He also has a career high ATP doubles ranking of 1189 achieved on 17 December 2018.

Kerdlaphee represents Thailand at the Davis Cup, where he has a W/L record of 0–1.

References

External links

1999 births
Living people
Kittirat Kerdlaphee
Kittirat Kerdlaphee